The women's sprint (2970 meters) event at the 2011 Asian Winter Games was held on 31 January at the Almaty Biathlon and Cross-Country Ski Complex.

Schedule
All times are Almaty Time (UTC+06:00)

Results

References

External links
Official Website

Women's sprint